Duchesne High School is a small, private, coeducational, Catholic high school in St. Charles, Missouri, USA, in the Roman Catholic Archdiocese of Saint Louis. The name commemorates St. Rose Philippine Duchesne, whose pioneering spirit was the driving force behind her missionary work throughout the region. Duchesne is classified as a regional high school by the Archdiocese of St. Louis, which means that certain parishes are "assigned" to this school as the primary areas served.

Duchesne High School was established as St. Peter High School in 1924. The school moved to its current location in 1956 and was renamed Duchesne Catholic High School.

Athletics 
Duchesne is a member of the Archdiocesan Athletic Association and of the Missouri State High School Activities Association.

Varsity teams have earned 76 conference titles, 87 district titles, have made 56 appearances in the state final four (up to 2009), and have won 15 state championships.
On March 11, 2020, led by Jack Johnsen (Captain), Jack Boschert, Kevin Burke, and Derek Cagle (Alternate Captain), the Duchesne hockey team captured its first Wickenheiser Cup Championship in a 3–1 win over Oakville.
The girls' soccer team won its sixth overall state title in 2019 (their 5th state title in 7 years) as well as the conference and district titles. The girls' soccer team has also won State Championships in 2009, 2013, 2014, 2015, and 2016.

The following teams are available to Duchesne students:

 American football (men) – freshman, junior varsity and varsity
 Baseball (men) – freshman, junior varsity and varsity
 Basketball (men & women) – freshman, junior varsity and varsity
 Cheerleading (women & men) – junior varsity and varsity
 Cross Country (men & women) – junior varsity and varsity
 Danceline (women & men) – varsity
 Golf (men & women) – junior varsity and varsity
 Soccer (men & women) – freshman, junior varsity and varsity
 Softball (women) – junior varsity and varsity
 Swimming (women) – varsity
 Tennis (men & women) – junior varsity and varsity
 Track & Field (men & women) – junior varsity and varsity
 Volleyball (women) – freshman, junior varsity and varsity
 Volleyball (men) – junior varsity and varsity

Duchesne also has a championship hockey team but it operates separately from the other interscholastic sports offered.

Prayer to St. Rose Philippine Duchesne and End of the day Prayer

This prayer is said every Monday morning to begin the school week. The leader reads the first segment and the whole student body joins in at "Each of us...."

(End of the day prayer)

May the Lord Bless and keep you. May the lord look kindly upon you and give you his peace. St. Damien DeVeuster pray for us, St. Katharine Drexel pray for us, St. Issac Jogues pray for us, St. Kateri Tekakwitha pray for us and St. Rose Philippine Duchesne pray for us

Amen.

Notable alumni

 Tom Heintzelman, MLB player (St. Louis Cardinals, San Francisco Giants)
 Brandon Joyce, UFL and CFL player
 Tony Lovasco, Missouri state representative since 2019
 Tara Osseck, Miss Missouri 2009, and Miss America 2010 contestant
 Scott T. Rupp, Missouri state senator 2006–2014 and Missouri state representative from 2003 to 2006
 Dan Borgmeyer, mayor of St. Charles, Missouri since 2019

References

External links
 School website
 Missouri State High School Activities Association (MSHSAA)

Roman Catholic Archdiocese of St. Louis
Roman Catholic secondary schools in St. Charles County, Missouri
Educational institutions established in 1924
St. Charles, Missouri
1924 establishments in Missouri